The Institut National de la Statistique du Niger (INS-Niger) is a national institute of Niger, which is dedicated to collecting data in the country. It is responsible for compiling data in the country and obtaining census data. It collects data on demographics, population, climatology, transport, industry, electricity, education and employment etc.

References

External links
Official site 
United Nations Statistical Agency information on the INSN.

Niger
Government of Niger